The European School, Brussels IV is one of the thirteen European Schools, and the fourth to be established within the city of Brussels, home to many European Union (EU) institutions. Opened in 2007, the school was initially based in the Brussels municipality of Forest, before moving to its purpose built campus in Laeken in 2012. The school combines nursery, primary and secondary education, with around 3,000 students enrolled at the start of the 2020–2021 academic year, spread over eight language sections (English, French, German, Dutch, Italian, Bulgarian (up to the sixth year of secondary), Romanian (up to the fifth year of secondary) and Estonian (up to the first year of secondary). The school prioritises the children of European Union (EU) staff for enrolment purposes, with others able to enrol provided there is capacity. Transport links to the school campus include Bockstael Station, which provides metro and suburban rail services.

See also 
European School
European Schools
European School, Brussels I
European School, Brussels II
European School, Brussels III
European School of Bruxelles-Argenteuil

References

External links 
 

Brussels IV
International schools in Brussels
Educational institutions established in 2007
2007 establishments in Belgium
Secondary schools in Brussels